Ptilinoxus is a genus of flies in the family Stratiomyidae.

Species
Ptilinoxus fallax Lindner, 1966
Ptilinoxus interruptum (Lindner, 1966)

References

Stratiomyidae
Brachycera genera
Taxa named by Erwin Lindner
Diptera of Africa